Guns Up! (stylized as GUNS UP!) is a free-to-play action strategy game developed by Valkyrie Entertainment and published by Sony Computer Entertainment. It was released on December 5, 2015 for the PlayStation 4. A Windows port was later released on February 5, 2018 through Steam. A mobile port developed and published by NHN Bigfoot with Valkyrie's involvement was released on April 1, 2022.

It received a mixed reception from critics, who commended its accessibility but criticized its lack of complexity and microtransactions.

Announced by the developers on October 13th, 2022, online services for Guns Up! would be terminated on April 14th, 2023. Since multiplayer and all other online services are required to play, it is considered unplayable. Only Guns Up! Mobile should be playable after that date (it is separate game from the Playstation and Steam version).

Gameplay
The game tasks players with creating an impenetrable base and an army to attack the bases of other players. The player must use munitions, the in-game currency, to do this, which is earned by attacking other players' bases. The multiplayer is asynchronous in that players cannot defend their bases, only direct their troops in capturing other bases. The player can randomly unlock special attacks on the field and from support cards.

There is the option to spend real currency to buy in-game gold, which can unlock special soldiers much faster, as well as customize the player's army and soldiers.
In battle, the player loses if their transport truck is destroyed.

Reception

IGN nominated Guns Up! for "Best Strategy Game" at E3 2014 

The game received mixed reception, with the aggregate score being 54/100 on Metacritic based on 13 reviews.

C.J. Andriessen of Destructoid rated the game 25/100, calling the game "repetitive, tedious" and "digital Ambien", and stated that the game was "un-fun" without spending money on microtransactions to increase the XP gained, but also said that the microtransactions made the game too easy.

Dean Takahashi of GamesBeat rated the game 70/100, finding it "fun and replayable", but criticizing the "slow network response". He compared it to Clash of Clans and said that it had the potential to bridge the gap between mobile and console games if the network was more reliable.

Ben Tarrant of Playstation Lifestyle gave the game a score of 75 out of 100 stating "Guns Up! is devilishly addictive" and, "leaving you with a constant desire to progress and improve both your settlement and your garrison of units".

Official PlayStation Magazine UK rated the game 40/100, saying that it felt "soulless" and that it was "a mobile freemium game in poor disguise".

References

2015 video games
Action video games
Free-to-play video games
Multiplayer video games
PlayStation Network games
PlayStation 4 games
Products and services discontinued in 2023
Sony Interactive Entertainment games
Strategy video games
Video games developed in the United States
Video games scored by Olof Gustafsson
Windows games